Sugar Creek is a stream in the U.S. state of Georgia. A tributary of the Ocmulgee River, it runs through Wheeler County, Georgia, Telfair County, Georgia, and Dodge County, Georgia until it meets the Alligator Creek, approximately two miles north of Lumber City, Georgia. Alligator Creek then meets the Ocmulgee River several miles further south. Georgia State Route 87 and Georgia State Route 117 intersect and cross over Sugar Creek just before entering the city limits of Eastman, Georgia, which Sugar Creek passes on the southwest. It also runs along the southwest border of the city of Chauncey and passes through the southwest border of the city of McRae–Helena. A 1911 survey of the area reported:

References

Rivers of Georgia (U.S. state)
Rivers of Dodge County, Georgia
Rivers of Telfair County, Georgia
Rivers of Wheeler County, Georgia